The Mile High Open was a golf tournament on the LPGA Tour from 1955 to 1956. It was played at the Lakewood Country Club in Lakewood, Colorado, a Denver suburb.

Winners
Denver Open
1956 Marlene Hagge

Mile High Open
1955 Marilynn Smith

References

Former LPGA Tour events
Golf in Colorado
Sports competitions in Denver
Lakewood, Colorado
History of women in Colorado